The 2010–11 Hong Kong First Division League (known as HKFA bma First Division League for sponsorship reasons) season was the 99th since its establishment. The 2010–11 Hong Kong First Division League is contested by 10 teams. The defending champions were South China. Hong Kong Football Club and Tuen Mun were promoted from the second division to take part.

Teams

Teams summaries

Stadia

Citizen had to move away from its usual home ground, Mong Kok Stadium, due to renovations.

Managerial changes

League table

Results

 All times are Hong Kong Time (UTC+8).

Top scorers
As the match played on 6 May 2011.

Home ground allocation

This season will be the first time in Hong Kong First Division League history that all 10 First Division clubs will be allocated their own sports ground for home games, without having to share with another club. Tseung Kwan O Sports Ground will be used for the league for the first time as Kitchee's home ground.

South China – Hong Kong Stadium (Capacity:40,000)
Kitchee – Tseung Kwan O Sports Ground (Capacity:3,500)
TSW Pegasus – Yuen Long Stadium (Capacity:5,000)
Sun Hei – Tsing Yi Sports Ground (Capacity:1,500)
Tai Po – Tai Po Sports Ground (Capacity:3,500)
Citizen – Siu Sai Wan Sports Ground (Capacity:12,000)
Fourway Athletics – Sham Shui Po Sports Ground (Capacity:2,000)
Tai Chung – Kowloon Bay Park (Capacity:1,500)
HKFC – Hong Kong Football Club Stadium (Capacity:2,750)
Tuen Mun – Tuen Mun Tang Shiu Kin Sports Ground (Capacity:2,200)

Double entertainment
Double entertainment is a term meaning two clubs will play their home games on the same ground one after the other, to attract more fans and save costs. Although both Sun Hei SC and Fourway Athletics would like to see the return of double entertainment, South China, Kitchee, Pegasus and Tai Chung are against it, while Tuen Mun's home ground do not have enough changing rooms to accommodate 4 teams. In the HKFA's published calendar, no double entertainment are listed.

References

Hong Kong First Division League seasons
1
Hong Kong